Steven Vandermeulen (born 28 December 1968) is a Canadian former swimmer. He competed in the men's 4 × 100 metre freestyle relay at the 1988 Summer Olympics.

References

External links
 

1965 births
Living people
Olympic swimmers of Canada
Swimmers at the 1988 Summer Olympics
People from Dawson Creek
Sportspeople from British Columbia
Pan American Games medalists in swimming
Pan American Games silver medalists for Canada
Swimmers at the 1991 Pan American Games
Commonwealth Games medallists in swimming
Commonwealth Games bronze medallists for Canada
Swimmers at the 1990 Commonwealth Games
Canadian male freestyle swimmers
Medalists at the 1991 Pan American Games
Medallists at the 1990 Commonwealth Games